Tjeerd Eize Korf (born 11 May 1983) is a Dutch former professional footballer who played as a striker.

Career
Born in Emmeloord, Korf began his career with Flevo Boys. He has also played professionally for FC Zwolle and SBV Excelsior.

Personal life
His father is ex-player Steven Korf.

External links
 
 
 Voetbal International

Living people
1983 births
People from Emmeloord
Footballers from Noordoostpolder
Association football forwards
Dutch footballers
Excelsior Rotterdam players
PEC Zwolle players
SC Veendam players
Eredivisie players
Eerste Divisie players
Flevo Boys players
WHC Wezep players
SC Genemuiden players